Morocco Tennis Tour may refer to one of six Moroccan professional tennis tournaments, all part of the ATP Challenger Tour :

Morocco Tennis Tour – Casablanca, played on outdoor red clay courts. It is held annually in Casablanca, Morocco, since 2011
Morocco Tennis Tour – Marrakech, played on outdoor red clay courts. It is held annually in Marrakech, Morocco, since 2007
Morocco Tennis Tour – Meknes, played on outdoor red clay courts. It is held annually in Meknes, Morocco, since 2008
Morocco Tennis Tour – Mohammedia, played on outdoor red clay courts. It is held annually in Mohammedia, Morocco, since 2014
Morocco Tennis Tour – Rabat, played on outdoor red clay courts. It is held annually in Rabat, Morocco, since 2007
Morocco Tennis Tour – Tanger, played on outdoor red clay courts. It is held annually in Tanger, Morocco, since 2008